The Last Temptation may refer to:

 The Last Temptation (Alice Cooper album), 1994
 The Last Temptation (Ja Rule album), 2002
 The Last Temptation (novel), a 2002 crime novel by Val McDermid
 The Last Temptation of Christ (novel) or The Last Temptation, a 1953 novel by Nikos Kazantzakis
 The Last Temptation of Christ (film), a 1988 film adaptation of the novel
 "Last Temptation" (House), a television episode